Nikki Kimball (born May 23, 1971) is an American distance runner specializing in the Ultramarathon. She ran her first 100-mile race at the Western States 100 Mile Endurance Run in 2004, and was the female winner. She was the winning female at Western States again in 2006 and 2007, becoming only the third woman to win Western States three times. In 2014, she won the Marathon Des Sables multi-stage endurance race on her first attempt. Prior to running, her main sport was cross-country skiing. She was crewed at the 2007 Western States by U.S. Senator Max Baucus of Montana, where Kimball lives. She lives in Bozeman, Montana.

Early life

Kimball grew up in Chittenden, Vermont, and had an active childhood spent outdoors hiking and cross-country skiing. A physician advised that Kimball start cross-country skiing when she was child, in order to stop her feet turning in. For high school, Nikki went to Holderness School, which is in Holderness New Hampshire and helped her develop her passions for many of the things she does today.

Career highlights

Ultra Marathon
Member of United States 100K Team 2001-2006; 8th overall and 1st American at World Cup 2003, Tainan, Taiwan; 7th at World Cup 2005; scoring member of gold medal 100K team at World Cup 2005
Western States 100 Champion 2004, 2006, 2007
1st place, Ultra Trail du Mont Blanc, 2007
50-Mile Trail National Champion 2003, 2004, 2005, Crystal Mountain, Washington
50-Mile Road National Champion 2005, State College, Pennsylvania. Broke course record by 23 minutes
Set course records at numerous 50-milers
1st place, American River 50-Mile, 2003 (fastest time by an American woman in 2002-2003
2nd Place, National 100K Championships, Pittsburgh, Pennsylvania, 2001
1st place, Marathon Des Sables, 2014
2nd place, Big Horn 100m, 2016
2nd place, HURT 100m, HI, 2017
2nd place, Hardrock 100, 2018

Mountain Running
Member of United States Mountain Running Team 2001-2003; 24th overall, 2nd American, World Mountain Running Trophy 2003, Girdwood, Alaska
Mt. Washington Road Race 2003, 2nd place, 1st American
New England Mountain Running Champion 2001, runner-up 2003
Set numerous course records

Trail Running
Bridger Ridge Run, 1st place, Bozeman, Montana, 2004 (course record)
Grand Tree Trail Race Series: undefeated in all races run in 2000-2002
Set course records in 9 New England Grand Tree races, 2000-2003
Pennsylvania State Trail Running Champion, 1998
Run the Rann, 1st place, Dholavira, Gujarat, India, 2014

Road Running
Road marathon wins also include Adirondack Marathon, Schroon, NY; Green Mountain Marathon, Grand Isle, VT; Great Potato Marathon, Boise, ID, Salt Lake City Marathon; Lewis and Clark Marathon, Bozeman, MT

Snowshoe Racing
U.S. National Champion 2001, 2004, 2005; runner-up 2003
Member of U.S. National Team 2003-2005

Awards, Other Athletic Achievement and Running Community Involvement
Set a new women's record for fastest supported time on Vermont's Long Trail, 273 miles in 5 days 7 hours 42 minutes, August 13–18, 2012. The record breaking attempt was captured in the documentary film "Finding Traction" 
Member of USATF Mountain/Ultra/Trail Council 2002 to 2005; Championship Chair 2005
Member of the 100K Task Force for USATF
Member of U.S. Snowshoe Association advisory board 2004-2005
1st place team Moab Adventure Xstream, 2005
North American Female Ultra Runner of Year 2003, 2004, 2007 (Ultrarunning magazine)
USATF Ultra Runner of the Year 2004
15K Biathlon U.S. Olympic Team Trials, 13th place, 1994
Williams College Ski Team 1989-93; skied to top-20 finishes in Division I NCAA National Championships all four years
Two-time winner of the Williams College Alumnae Ski Award

Personal life
Kimball suffers from depression, and refers to it as her secret weapon.

References

1971 births
Living people
American female ultramarathon runners
Holderness School alumni
21st-century American women